Campanula rotundifolia, the harebell, Scottish bluebell, or bluebell of Scotland, is a species of flowering plant in the bellflower family Campanulaceae. This herbaceous perennial is found throughout the temperate regions of the northern hemisphere. In Scotland, it is often known simply as bluebell. It is the floral emblem of Sweden where it is known as small bluebell. It produces its violet-blue, bell-shaped flowers in late summer and autumn.

The Latin specific epithet rotundifolia means "round leaved". However, not all leaves are round in shape. Middle stem-leaves are linear.

Description
Campanula rotundifolia is a slender, prostrate to erect herbaceous perennial, spreading by seed and rhizomes. The basal leaves are long-stalked, rounded to heart-shaped, usually slightly toothed, with prominent hydathodes, and often wither early. Leaves on the flowering stems are long and narrow and the upper ones are unstemmed. The inflorescence is a panicle or raceme, with 1 to many flowers borne on very slender pedicels. Plants with pale pink or white flowers may also occur. The petal lobes are triangular and curve outwards. The seeds are produced in a capsule about  diameter and are released by pores at the base of the capsule. Seedlings are minute, but established plants can compete with tall grass. As with many other Campanula species, all parts of the plant exude white latex when injured or broken.

The flowering period is long and varies by location. In the British Isles, harebell flowers from July to November. In Missouri, it flowers from May to August; in Minnesota, from June to October. The flowers are pollinated by bees, but can self-pollinate.

Taxonomy
Campanula rotundifolia was first formally described in 1753 by Carl Linnaeus. , no varieties or subspecies of Campanula rotundifolia are accepted in Plants of the World Online. Several species have been previously described as varieties or subspecies of C. rotundifolia:
 Campanula alaskana (Campanula rotundifolia var. alaskana or hirsuta)
 Campanula giesekiana (C. r. var. dubia or var. groenlandica)
 Campanula intercedens (C. r. var. dentata or intercedens)
 Campanula kladniana (C. r. subsp. kladniana)
 Campanula macrorhiza (C. r. var. aitanica or alcoiana)
 Campanula moravica (C. r. subsp. moravica)
 Campanula nejceffii (C. r. var. bulgarica)
 Campanula petiolata (C. r. var. petiolata)
 Campanula ruscinonensis (C. r. var. ruscinonensis)
 Campanula willkommii (C. r. subsp. willkommii)

While it is now commonly known as harebell or bluebell, it was historically known by several other names including blawort, hair-bell, lady's thimble, witch's bells, and witch's thimbles. 

Elsewhere in Britain, "bluebell" refers to Hyacinthoides non-scripta, and in North America, "bluebell" typically refers to species in the genus Mertensia, such as Mertensia virginica (Virginia bluebells).

Distribution and habitat
Campanula rotundifolia occurs from Spitzbergen, extending in mainland Europe from northernmost Scandinavia to the Pyrenees and the French Mediterranean coast. It also occurs on the southern coasts of Greenland, on Iceland and on southern Novaya Zemlya. It is not found in Canada (see other Campanula species, such as Campanula alaskana).

It occurs as tetraploid or hexaploid populations in Britain and Ireland, but diploids occur widely in continental Europe. In Britain, the tetraploid population has an easterly distribution and the hexaploid population a westerly distribution, and very little mixing occurs at the range boundaries.

Harebells grow in dry, nutrient-poor grasslands and heaths. The plant often successfully colonises cracks in walls or cliff faces and stable dunes.

C. rotundifolia is more inclined to occupy climates that have an average temperature below 0 °C in the cold months and above 10 °C in the summer.

In Iceland, research on Campanula rotundifolia has revealed that it is a host of at least three species of pathogenic fungi, Coleosporium tussilaginis, Puccinia campanulae and Sporonema campanulae (and the teleomorph Leptotrochila radians).

In culture
The harebell is dedicated to Saint Dominic.

In 2002 Plantlife named it the county flower of Yorkshire in the United Kingdom.

William Shakespeare makes a reference to 'the azured hare-bell' in Cymbeline:

With fairest flowers,
Whilst summer lasts, and I live here, Fidele,
I'll sweeten thy sad grave: thou shalt not lack
The flower that's like thy face, pale primrose, nor
The azured hare-bell, like thy veins; no, nor
The leaf of eglantine, whom not to slander,
Out-sweeten’d not thy breath.

Christina Rossetti (1830–1894) wrote a poem entitled 'Hope is Like A Harebell':

Hope is like a harebell, trembling from its birth,
Love is like a rose, the joy of all the earth,
Faith is like a lily, lifted high and white,
Love is like a lovely rose, the world’s delight.
Harebells and sweet lilies show a thornless growth,
But the rose with all its thorns excels them both.

Emily Dickinson uses the harebell as an analogy for desire that grows cold once that which is cherished is attained:

Did the Harebell loose her girdle
To the lover Bee
Would the Bee the Harebell hallow
Much as formerly?

Did the paradise – persuaded
Yield her moat of pearl
Would the Eden be an Eden
Or the Earl – an Earl

Notes

References

rotundifolia
Flora of Europe
Plants described in 1753
Taxa named by Carl Linnaeus